Gaziantepspor was a Turkish football club located in the city of Gaziantep. Formed in 1969 and dissolved in 2020, Gaziantepspor were nicknamed the Şahinler (The Falcons). The club colours were black and red, and they played their home matches at New Gaziantep Stadium.

History
The first sports club in Gaziantep was founded by students at the American College in 1923. Several other clubs were founded soon after; Altınışık, Kilis İdman Yurdu Spor Kulübü, and Türkocağı Spor Kulübü. However, these clubs did not last long, with Altınışık and Türkocağı folding in 1929 and 1931 respectively. Türkocağı went on to merge with Sanatkarlar Spor Kulübü to form Gaziantep İdman Yurdu. The club did not register in time for the Gaziantep amateur league and were only permitted to compete in friendly matches. Gaziantep Idman Yurdu disbanded in 1932. There were no clubs in Gaziantep until 1938, with the sports branch of the community centre taking over and running all sporting activities.

Gaziantepspor which bears the name of Gaziantep city was founded in the first days of 1969. Gaziantep city's leading people held a meeting under the chairmanship of Mayor Abdulkadir Batur and they made a first attempt for the foundation of the club.

Later on, as a result of continuing meetings, Gaziantepspor Club was founded in 1969. Important figures in Gaziantep held a meeting with then-mayor Abdülkadir Batur in order to form the club. A total of 58 people helped with the foundation of Gaziantepspor in 1969. Besir Bayram who was a founder member, has been a first president. The club contested friendly matches in their first season. They were allowed to join the TFF Third League in 1970. Gaziantepspor, activities.

Gaziantepspor finished its first season by playing friendly matches. The red–blacks started to play in the Turkish League in 1970–71 season through a decree executed in 1970 which allowed city teams play directly in the third division. In their first season of professional football, Gaziantepspor finished third in the 3.Lig, Yeşil Grup (Green Group).

The club finished second in the 2.Lig in 1974–75, barely missing promotion by three points. Gaziantepspor were promoted to the top-flight after the 1978–79 season. The club managed to stay afloat in their first season in the 1.Lig, finishing one point above the relegation zone. The club was relegated in 1983, but earned promotion back to the top-flight in 1990, where they have competed since. The club had the best position in the top-flight as 3rd in the 1999–2000 and 2000–01 seasons. In the 2016–17 season, Gaziantepspor was relegated from the Super Lig. In the 2017–18 season, they were relegated from the 1.Lig.

Gaziantepspor, who competed in Group White of 2018–19 TFF Second League, announced that they withdrew from the league in January 2019 after receiving -36 points. They announced that they will resume the fight in the Turkish Regional Amateur League in the 2019–20 season. In 2019, FIFA issued a 21-point deletion penalty to red-blacks for debt to their former players. However, since the creditors of the former players were not paid in the 2019–20 season, the club withdrew in the Amateur League with -15 points and finished the league in the last place and went bankrupt and closed its activities.

Crest and colours
The club colours are red and black. The colours were chosen as a dedication to the martyrs who gave up their lives to defend Gaziantep; black for the martyrs, and red for the martyrs blood.

Gaziantepspor’s crest represents the city's landmarks and was designed under the guidance of ex-chairman Celal Doğan. Gaziantep castle is symbolized by the outline of the logo. Above the Gaziantep banner lies the martyr's memorial, the checkered background represents the cities treat to the world, the famous dessert ‘Baklava’. In the foreground is a şahin (hawk/falcon in Turkish) which is the club's nickname as well as the name of one of the city's heroes Şahin Bey.

Stadium

Gaziantepspor play their home matches at Gaziantep Kamil Ocak Stadium. The stadium is named after former politician Kamil Ocak (1914–69), who was a member of parliament and a minister of state responsible for sports between 1965 and 1969; he helped build sporting facilities in Gaziantep. The stadium was opened in 1974 and it currently seats 16,981 spectators. The field is covered with grass, and the stadium also has floodlights.

Support
The club enjoy most of their support from the city and surrounding provinces. Their main ultra group is called Gençlik 27, meaning the Youth 27, as number 27 corresponds to the province's code. Gençlik 27 was founded in 1996 by Hasan Günoğlu also known as Hasan Reis (Reis meaning Boss).  The supporter group are renowned for creating a great atmosphere at home games with their red flares flags and are found in the 5th and 6th stands behind the goal. Gaziantepspor fans also are known for being proud of their Anatolian heritage, playing national Turku Anadolu music, causing trouble, causing fights, violence and many crowd trouble is reported at games, which is caused by every fan and club in Turkish football as it is more than religion for the Turkish population.

Honours

Domestic
 Turkish Süper Lig
Third: 1999–00, 2000–01
Fourth: 1980–81, 2002–03, 2003–04, 2010–11

 Bank Asya 1. Lig
Winners: 1978–79, 1989–90

 TFF Third League
Winners: 1971–72

Cup
 Spor Toto Cup
Winners: 2011–12
 TSYD Cup (Ankara)
Winners: 1990
 TSYD Cup (Adana)
Winners: 1979, 1990, 1991, 1996
 Gençlik ve Spor Bakanlığı Cup
Winners: 1978–79

Domestic leagues record

Leagues participation
 Turkish Super League: 1979–83, 1990–2017
 TFF First League: 1972–79, 1983–90, 2017–18
 TFF Second League: 1970-72, 2018–19
 Turkish Regional Amateur League: 2019–20

Recent seasons
{|class="wikitable"  style="text-align: center;"
|-
!Season!!Div.!!Pos.!!Pl.!!W!!D!!L!!GS!!GA!!P!!Cup!!Manager
|-
||2005–06
| SL||11||34||10||10||14||34||50||40
|SF
| Walter Zenga
|-
||2006–07
| SL||11||34||11||10||13||31||39||43
|QF
| Samet Aybaba
|-
|2007–08
| SL||9||34||11||10||13||36||45||43
|
| Erdoğan Arıca /  Mesut Bakkal
|-
|2008–09
| SL||8||34||12||11||11||46||48||47
|
| Nurullah Sağlam
|-
|2009–10
| SL||13||34||9||13||12||38||39||40
|
| José Couceiro
|-
|2010–11
| SL||4||34||17||8||9||44||33||59
|SF
| Tolunay Kafkas
|-
|2011–12
| SL||10||34||13||9||12||39||33||48
|
| Abdullah Ercan /  Hikmet Karaman
|-
|2012–13
| SL||10||34||12||10||12||42||49||46
|
| Hikmet Karaman /  Bülent Uygun
|-
|2013–14
| SL||15||34||10||7||17||38||58||37
|
| Bülent Uygun /  Sergen Yalçın /  Tahsin Tam
|-
|2014–15
| SL||10 ||34||11||7||16||31||48||40
|
| Okan Buruk
|-
|2015–16
| SL||14 ||34 ||9||9||16||31||50||36
|
|
|-
|2016–17
| SL||17 ||34||7||5||22||30||65||26
|
|Relegated
|-
|2017–18
| 1L||18 ||34 ||2||4||28||18||100||1
|
|Relegated
|-
|2018–19
| 2L||18 ||34||3||2||29||11||92||-34
|
|Relegated
|-
|2019–20
| ||14 ||21||3||0||18||16||64||-15
|
|Dissolved
|}

Continental competitions record
UEFA Cup / UEFA Europa League:

UEFA Intertoto Cup:

UEFA club competition record

Team records

All-time top scorers

References

External links

Gaziantepspor on TFF.org

 
Association football clubs established in 1969
Sport in Gaziantep
Defunct football clubs in Turkey
1969 establishments in Turkey
Association football clubs disestablished in 2020
2020 disestablishments in Turkey
Süper Lig clubs